In cricket, the projapoti is a type of delivery executed typically by medium pace and fast bowlers. Projapoti is the Bengali word for butterfly. The delivery is so named because of its tendency to move unpredictably in mid-flight, similar to the knuckleball in baseball. This occurs due to the absence of any spin applied to the delivery, thus leaving the ball subject to the vagaries of spin-less flight through the air.

The delivery was first used by the Bangladesh national cricket team, in particular by bowler Rubel Hossain. He and others reportedly received the guidance of bowling coach Ian Pont in developing the delivery. Similar deliveries lacking spin have, however, been used before the Projapoti’s christening, including by medium pace bowler Zaheer Khan.

See also
 Glossary of cricket terms
 Bowling (cricket)
 Knuckleball

References

Bowling (cricket)
Cricket terminology